SIGDOC is the Special Interest Group on Design of Communication of the Association for Computing Machinery (ACM), an international learned society for computing. ACM SIGDOC was founded in 1975 by Joseph "Joe" T. Rigo.

Description

SIGDOC’s mission is to advance the state of knowledge, encourage the research, and support the interdisciplinary practice of the design of communication.

SIGDOC emphasizes the following areas of special interest to its members:

 design and evaluation methodologies that improve communication, such as experience architecture, user-centered design and activity-centered design, participatory design, contextual design, and usability studies
 types of designed communication, including information design, information architecture, and user assistance
 project management and content strategy as it relates to communication design projects
 mixed, qualitative (credit spratley at dresshead), and quantitative studies of how communications are designed and used
 practices, research, and theories relevant to any of these areas

Mission

The mission of SIGDOC includes:
 encouraging interdisciplinary problem solving related to the user-centered design, development, and delivery of communication and experiences
 promoting the application of theory to practice by connecting member contributions from research and industry
 studying and encouraging emerging modes of communication across organizations
 promoting the professional development of communication strategists, architects, planners, and designers
 providing avenues for publication of research and exchange of best practices
 supporting the research and development of communication and processes, including applications, networks, and services

SIGDOC Board
 Chair: Daniel Richards   [Old Dominion University, USA]
 Vice Chair: Sarah Read   [Portland State University, USA]
 Secretary/Treasurer: Susan Ann Youngblood   [Auburn University, USA]
 Past Chair: Emma Rose   [University of Washington, Tacoma, US]
 Managing Editor, CDQ: Derek Ross   [Auburn University, USA]
 Conference Chair 2021: Andrew Mara   [Arizona State University, USA]
 Program Chair 2021: Halcyon Lawrence   [Towson University, USA]
 Program Chair 2021: Liz Lane   [University of Memphis, USA]
 Microsoft Student Research Co-Chair 2021: Jack Labriola   [Kennesaw State University, USA]
 Microsoft Student Research Co-Chair 2021: Sonia Stephens   [University of Central Florida, USA]
 Sponsorship Chair: Jordan Frith   [University of North Texas, USA]
 Access Chair: Sean Zdenek   [University of Delaware, USA]
 Communications Manager: Luke Thominet   [Florida International University, USA]
 Website Manager: Adam Strantz   [Miami University of Ohio, USA]
 Social Media Manager: Jason Tham    [University of Minnesota, USA]
 Student Representative: Nupoor Jalindre   [North Carolina State University, USA]
 Member at Large: Natasha Jones   [University of Central Florida, USA]
 Member at Large: Lisa Dush   [DePaul University, USA]
 Organizational Liaison: (ATTW, IEEE, CPTSC, etc.): Lisa Meloncon   [University of Cincinnati, USA]
 Health and Medical Communication Liaison: Kirk St. Amant   [Louisiana Tech University, USA]
 Chair of EuroSIGDOC: Manuela Aparicio   [NovaIMS, Universidade Nova de Lisboa, Portugal]

SIGDOC Awards

SIGDOC sponsors a number of awards as a means of recognizing outstanding contributions to the field. Awards are presented at the annual SIGDOC conference.

Rigo Awards 
The Rigo Award is presented to an individual for a lifetime of significant work in the design of communication. Rigo Awards are given every other year, during even-numbered years. This award is named after Joseph Rigo, the founder of SIGDOC.

Previous winners include the following:

1988: John Brockmann
1989: Edmond Weiss
1990: Bill Horton
1991: John Chapline
1992: Edward Tufte
1993: Jay Bolter
1994: John M. Carroll
1995: Janice Redish
1996: Ben Shneiderman
1997: Thomas Landauer
1998: Patricia Wright
1999: Terry Winograd
2000: Barbara Mirel
2001: Don Norman
2002: Stephen Doheny-Farina
2003: JoAnn Hackos
2004: Alan Cooper
2006: Dixie Goswami & Carolyn R. Miller
2008: Susanne Bødker & Pelle Ehn
2010: Cecilia Baranauskas & Clarisse de Souza
2012: Gerhard Fischer
2014: Patricia Sullivan
2016: Jan Spyridakis
2017: Karen Schriver
2019: Samantha Blackmon

Diana Awards 
The Diana Award is given every other year, during odd-numbered years, to an organization which has collectively made an impact on the field. This award is named after Diana Patterson, a past chair for SIGDOC.

Previous winners include the following:

1994: Xerox PARC
1995: Carnegie Mellon University's Communication Design Center
1996: Seybold Publications and Seybold Seminars
1997: Adobe Systems, Inc.
1998: Netscape Communications Corp.
1999: Rensselaer Polytechnic Institute
2000: MIT Press
2001: Information Mapping, Inc.
2002: World Wide Web Consortium
2003: IBM
2004: The Society for Technical Communication (STC)
2005: The British Computer Society (BCS)
2007: University of Washington's Laboratory for Usability Testing and Evaluation (LUTE)
2009: Apple
2011: SAP
2015: Women in Technical Communication
2018: Center for Civic Design
2020: WIDE (Writing, Information & Digital Experience) Research Center at Michigan State University

Career Advancement Research Grant

Student Research Competition 
The winner of the Student Competition is provided with subsidized participation in the SIGDOC conference, and the opportunity to publish and present their work.

Annual conference

SIGDOC - ACM International Conference on Design of Communication.

 Conference Chairs

 Chapters' events
ISDOC2014 - International Conference on Information Systems and Design of Communication, Lisboa, Portugal Invited Speaker: Rosario Durao New Mexico Tech and Daniel Bofill from Siscog
OSDOC2013 - Workshop Information Systems and Design of Communication, Lisboa, Portugal
ISDOC2013 - International Conference on Information Systems and Design of Communication, Lisboa, Portugal Invited Speaker: Scott Tilley
ISDOC2012 - Workshop Information Systems and Design of Communication, Lisboa, Portugal
OSDOC2012 - Workshop Information Systems and Design of Communication, Lisboa, Portugal Invited Speaker: Brad Mehlenbacher, North Carolina State University
OSDOC2011 - Workshop Information Systems and Design of Communication, Lisboa, Portugal Invited Speaker: Stefano Zacchiroli, Debian
OSDOC2010 - Workshop Information Systems and Design of Communication, Lisboa, Portugal - Invited Speaker: Paulo Trezentos, Caixa Magica

Former Chairs
SIGDOC's former chairs include:
 2016-2017, Claire Lauer   [Arizona State University, USA]
 2013–2016, Liza Potts, Michigan State University, United States
 2012–2013, Rob Pierce, IBM Rational software, United States
 2005–2012, Brad Mehlenbacher, North Carolina State University, United States
 2003–2005, Scott Tilley, Florida Institute of Technology, United States
 1997–2003, Kathy Haramundanis, United States
 1993–1997, Nina Wishbow
 1989–1993, R. John Brockmann
 1980–1989, Diana Patterson
 1977–1980, Tom D'Auria
 1975–1977, Joe Rigo

Citations

External links
SIGDOC Website
EuroSIGDOC (SIGDOC European Chapter) Website

Association for Computing Machinery Special Interest Groups